is a Japanese football player who plays for Kagoshima United FC.

Club statistics
Updated to 23 February 2018.

References

External links

1984 births
Living people
Association football people from Wakayama Prefecture
Japanese footballers
J1 League players
J2 League players
J3 League players
Cerezo Osaka players
Cerezo Osaka U-23 players
Kagoshima United FC players
Association football midfielders
People from Gobō, Wakayama